Beilrode is a municipality in the district Nordsachsen, in Saxony, Germany. It absorbed the former municipality Großtreben-Zwethau in January 2011. It consists of the Ortsteile (divisions) Beilrode, Dautzschen, Döbrichau, Döhlen, Eulenau, Großtreben, Kreischau, Last, Neubleesern, Rosenfeld and Zwethau.

Infamous residents
Fritz Ritterbusch (1894–1946), German Nazi SS concentration camp commander executed for war crimes

References 

Nordsachsen